John Francis "Sean" Lynch (born 22 September 1942) is a former Ireland international rugby union player He played for and captained Leinster. He owns the Swan Bar on Aungier Street in Dublin

Lynch was capped 15 times as a prop for Ireland between 1971 and 1975 and toured New Zealand in 1971 with the British and Irish Lions playing in all four tests against the All Blacks. He played club rugby for St. Mary's College R.F.C.

References

1942 births
Living people
Irish rugby union players
Ireland international rugby union players
British & Irish Lions rugby union players from Ireland
St Mary's College RFC players
Rugby union props